Maryam Moghaddam (born ) is an Iranian actress, screenwriter and director. She is best known for her acting in Closed Curtain (2013), Risk of Acid Rain (2015) and Ballad of a White Cow (2020). She has received various accolades, including a Crystal Simorgh, in addition to nomination for an Iran's Film Critics and Writers Association Award.

Filmography

Film 

 Fallet, 2009 (STV series, Director: Caroline Cowan)
 Chalsio, 2011(TV movie, Director: Behtash Sanaeeha
 Termites, 2017 (Director: Masoud Hatami)

Awards and nominations 
 Winner of the best screenplay in 33rd Fajr Film Festival - IRAN 2015(Risk Of Acid Rain)
 Winner of the best documentary film award in Prague Film Festival 2018.(The Invincible Diplomacy Of Mr. Naderi)
 Winner of the best documentary film award in Iran documentary Film Festival (cinema Verite)2017.(The Invincible Diplomacy Of Mr. Naderi)
 Winner of the best documentary film award in hafez film festival 2017 (The Invincible Diplomacy Of Mr. Naderi)
 Nominee for Best Actress in a Leading Role in 38th edition of the Fajr Film Festival - IRAN 2019
 Nominee for Best Script in 38th edition of the Fajr Film Festival - IRAN 2019

References

External links
 

Living people
1970 births
People from Tehran
Actresses from Tehran
Iranian film actresses
Iranian women film directors
Iranian expatriates in Sweden